Sarai Naurang is a tehsil located in Lakki Marwat District, Khyber Pakhtunkhwa, Pakistan. The population is 296,908 according to the 2017 census. It is a mostly rural area, but it does contain one urban area, the town of Naurang, which has a population of 29,955.  Naurang is the second-largest city in Lakki Marwat District and the third-largest in Bannu Division.

See also 
 Lakki Marwat
 Bannu
 Lakki Marwat District
 Bannu Division
 Ghoriwala
 List of tehsils of Khyber Pakhtunkhwa

References 

Tehsils of Khyber Pakhtunkhwa
Populated places in Lakki Marwat District